Panelház (Short: panel) is a Hungarian term for a type of concrete block of flats (panel buildings), built in the People's Republic of Hungary and other Eastern Bloc countries.

It was the main urban housing type in the Socialist-era, which still dominates the Hungarian cityscape.

According to the 2011 census, there were 829,177 panel apartments in Hungary (18.9% of the dwellings) that were home to 1,741,577 people (17.5% of the total population). Panelház are not the only type of block of flats in Hungary; as of 2014, 31.6% of Hungarians lived in flats (according to data from Eurostat).

History

After World War II a serious housing crisis developed in Hungary due to rapid population growth and urbanization. The exodus of the rural population after the collectivization in the late 1940s and the early 1950s from rural areas was particularly important as a source of migration. Budapest and other cities became overcrowded, and the Communist government eventually responded. After several study visits and conventions, in the early 1960s Hungary bought the large-panel system (LPS) from the Soviet Union and Denmark. The Danish technology was known as Larsen-Nielsen system and was a common housing method in Western Europe, Turkey, and Hong Kong. By the late 1960s, Hungarian engineers developed the country's own large-panel system (mostly based on the Soviet LPS), adapted to the Hungarian situation. The large-panel system permitted rapid construction that was not constrained by Hungary's relatively cold winters. After the 1968 Ronan Point explosion (a Larsen-Nielsen-type tower block partially collapsed in London) Hungarian engineers modified the original system, made the structure more compact and the joints stronger. The Larsen-Nielsen system was retired in Hungary in 1970.

The first, experimental panel residential building was built in Dunaújváros (new industrial city) in 1961, followed by other blocks in Pécs and Debrecen in 1963. The first precast concrete panel work was finished in 1962 in Dunaújváros, while the first large-panel system (LPS) housing factory (these works produced near all parts of these buildings, including the built-up kitchen units and the built-up wardrobes), was built in 1965 in Óbuda, Budapest. The first LPS building also was built in Óbuda in 1965.

The structure of Hungarian cities in the immediate post-war period consisted of a historic core surrounded by mostly single-story buildings and workers' houses, predominantly on unpaved streets. The nationwide public housing program of the 1960s changed this. The Communist government demolished the single-story buildings, replacing them with panel blocks. It also created new neighbourhoods on former farmland around the cities.

Panel apartments provided their inhabitants with a real improvement in living conditions. Two and three-bedroom sunny apartments with district heating, piped hot water, and flush toilets replaced what had been predominantly one-bedroom dwellings without modern conveniences. According to the 1960 census, one-bedroom flats made up 60% of the dwellings in Budapest; this had decreased to 25% in 1990. During this period, the share of dwellings with three or more bedrooms rose from 9% to 35%. The last panel building was finished in 1993.

The Hungarian government and local municipalities started renovation programs during the 2000s. These programs insulated the panel buildings, replaced the old doors and windows with multi-layer thermo glass, renovated the heating system, and gave the buildings more attractive exterior colours.

These buildings still dominate the Hungarian cityscape. The share of panel dwellings is 31% in Budapest, 39% in Debrecen, 52% in Miskolc, 38% in Szeged, 42% in Pécs, 41% in Győr, 50% in Székesfehérvár and 60% in Dunaújváros.

Former housing factories

Former panel works

Statistics

According to the 2011 census, there were 829,177 panel flats in Hungary (777,263 inhabited, 51,914 tenantless, 18.9% of the dwellings overall), of whom there were 548,464 flats (66.1%) in large-panel system buildings (LPS) and 280,713 (33.9%) in precast concrete (PC) buildings (the LPS is originally unplastered, while the PC is plastered and painted). 7,423 (0.9%) flats were built before 1960, 115,471 (13.9%) in the 1960s, 396,158 (47.8%) in the 1970s, 262,004 (31.6%) in the 1980s, while 48,121 (5.8%) flats were built after 1990.  These flats were home to 1,741,577 people (17.5% of the total population). There were 58,698 (7.1% of the total) one-bedroom, 421,274 (50.8%) two-bedroom, 271,422 (32.7%) three-bedroom flat, while 77,783 panel flats (9.4%) had four or more bedroom in 2011.

Average floor space was 54 m² for an LPS flat and 69 m² for a PC flat in 2011, lower than the national average (78 m²). The average floor space for a state-built flat (mostly panel flats) was 48 m² in the 1960s, 53 m² in the 1970s and 55 m² in the 1980s, significantly smaller than a privately built one (panel blocks also were built by non-governmental organizations, mostly housing cooperatives). Despite economic hardship, flats got even bigger in the late 1980s (before the fall of the Communism), the largest panel flats were built in the Káposztásmegyer housing estate of Budapest with 124 m².

The society of panel housing estates was heterogeneous until the privatization in the early 1990s (after the fall of the Communism), when the poor and the rich fled from these buildings, made them middle class characteristic. The residents of panel buildings predominantly have an above-average level of education, according to the 2011 census, 19.1% of the residents over 25 had Bachelor's degree or higher, while the national average was 17.3%.

Largest panel housing estates

Other countries
Khrushchyovka (Former Soviet Union)
Panelák and Sídlisko (Czech Republic and Slovakia)
Plattenbau (Germany)
Systematization (Romania)
Ugsarmal bair (Mongolian People's Republic)

In popular culture
Béla Tarr's film Panelkapcsolat tells a doomed love story set in a housing project in Hungary. Special Mention at the 1982 Locarno Film Festival.

See also
Housing estate

 Public housing

 Affordable housing

Subsidized housing
Urban planning in communist countries

References

Architecture in Hungary
Hungary–Soviet Union relations
Denmark–Hungary relations
Urban planning in Hungary
Hungarian People's Republic
Prefabricated buildings
Concrete buildings and structures
Public housing